Harita may refer to:

 Harita Maharaja, legendary Indian king
 the author of Harita Samhita
 Harita (moth)
 Harita Group, Indonesian business conglomerate
 Malavika Harita, Indian business executive
 Harita Kaur Deol, Indian pilot